Montezuma, also referred to as Spring Hill, is a historic home located near Norwood, Nelson County, Virginia. It was erected around 1790, and is a notable example of Piedmont Virginia Federal architecture. It has a two-story main block with a -story wing, laid in Flemish bond brick, with a Roman Revival dwarf portico. It is associated with the Cabell family, who settled in Nelson County in the second quarter of the 18th century. Because of his friendship with the Cabell family, the use of the Roman Doric order, certain exterior details and the floor plan, Thomas Jefferson is often associated with the design of the home.

It was listed on the National Register of Historic Places in 1980.

References

Houses in Nelson County, Virginia
Federal architecture in Virginia
Houses on the National Register of Historic Places in Virginia
National Register of Historic Places in Nelson County, Virginia
Houses completed in 1790